Aetna Station No. 5 is located in Fond du Lac, Wisconsin.

History
The building served as a fire station until 1985. Afterwards, the first floor was converted into office space and the second floor into apartments. It was listed on the National Register of Historic Places in 1976 and on the State Register of Historic Places in 1989.

References

Fire stations on the National Register of Historic Places in Wisconsin
Residential buildings on the National Register of Historic Places in Wisconsin
Office buildings on the National Register of Historic Places in Wisconsin
National Register of Historic Places in Fond du Lac County, Wisconsin
Italianate architecture in Wisconsin
Brick buildings and structures
Government buildings completed in 1875